Coraline Vitalis (born 9 May 1995) is a French fencer. She competed in the 2020 Summer Olympics.

References

1995 births
Living people
Sportspeople from Paris
People from Le Gosier
Fencers at the 2020 Summer Olympics
French female épée fencers
Olympic fencers of France
Mediterranean Games competitors for France
Competitors at the 2022 Mediterranean Games
21st-century French women